Uganda Be Kidding Me: Live is a Netflix stand-up comedy special by Chelsea Handler in support of her New York Times Best-Selling book of the same name. It was filmed in Chicago at the Harris Theater on June 20, and released on Netflix on October 10, 2014.

References

External links
 
 

2010s American television specials
2010s in Chicago
2014 television specials
Films shot in Chicago
Netflix specials
Stand-up comedy concert films
2014 comedy films